Sándor Szoboszlai (22 March 1925 – 4 January 2013) was a Hungarian actor.

Biography

He started his career as an amateur actor. He was a member of the Theatre of Youths and the Petőfi Theatre. He received a degree at the Artist Academy in 1954.  He worked for Jókai Theatre of Békéscsaba and Gárdonyi Géza Theatre of Eger between 1956 and 1972.

Later he worked for Vidám Színpad for two and for Petőfi Theatre of Veszprém for 17 years. He was nominated as a representative by Hungarian Democratic Forum during the 1994 parliamentary election. He died in Veszprém.

Sources

Further information
 Magyar színházművészeti lexikon, mek.oszk.hu; accessed 25 March 2017.
 Profile, Filmkatalógus.hu; accessed 25 March 2017. 
 Profile, szinhaziadattar.hu; accessed 25 March 2017.

1925 births
2013 deaths
Hungarian male stage actors
People from Komárom-Esztergom County
Recipients of the Order of Merit of the Republic of Hungary